Mohannad Othman Al-Maharmeh (born December 30, 1986) is a retired Jordanian footballer.

Mohannad is currently married and has a son named Othman.

International career
The last match Mohannad played for his national team Jordan was against Palestine on 11 December 2011 in the 2011 Pan Arab Games, which resulted in a 4-1 victory for Jordan.

Honors and Participation in International Tournaments

In Asian Games
2006 Asian Games

In Pan Arab Games 
2011 Pan Arab Games

In WAFF Championships 
2008 WAFF Championship

International goals

With U-23 Team

With Senior Team

References

External links
 
 

1984 births
Living people
Association football midfielders
Jordanian footballers
Jordan international footballers
Jordanian expatriate footballers
Jordan youth international footballers]
Expatriate footballers in Saudi Arabia
Jordanian expatriate sportspeople in Saudi Arabia
Al-Qadsiah FC players
Al-Faisaly SC players
Shabab Al-Ordon Club players
Sahab SC players
Al-Jazeera (Jordan) players
Jordanian Pro League players
Saudi Professional League players
Footballers at the 2006 Asian Games
Asian Games competitors for Jordan